Ganapathikurichi is a village of Nallur Panchayat union in Tittakudi taluk, Cuddalore district, Tamil Nadu. It is a well developed and unimpeachable agricultural village and most of peoples are farmers. It has a mariyamman and draupadi temple & a village health center. The village is known for cashews and sugarcanes.

The village has more than 700 families and a population of approximately 3500 people. It is located along the Vellar River near the border of the Cuddalore and Ariyalur districts. The languages spoken are Tamil and English.

Schools and colleges
 Govt primary school, ganapathikurichi.
 Govt high school, pelandurai.
 Govt higher secondary school, pennadam.
 Sri krishna matriculation higher secondary school, pennadam.
 Aruna sugars higher secondary school, eraiyur.
 Govt arts and science college, viruthachalam.
 Thiru navalar nedunchezhiyan engineering college, thozhudur.
 Govt arts and science college, ariyalur.

Villages in Cuddalore district